The Torlesse Composite Terrane is a plate tectonic terrane forming part of the South Island of New Zealand. It contains the Rakaia, Aspiring and Pahau Terranes and the Esk Head Belt. Greywacke (or Torlesse Greywacke) is the dominant rock type of the composite terrane; argillite is less common and there are minor basalt occurrences. The Torlesse Composite Terrane is found east of the Alpine Fault in the Southern Alps of New Zealand. Its southern extent is a cryptic boundary with the Caples Terrane within the Haast Schists in Central Otago. It is named for the Torlesse Range in Canterbury.

Description 
The Rakaia Terrane rocks, of Permian to late Triassic age (300–200 Ma), occur south of Rangiora. The Pahau Terrane rocks, of Late Jurassic to Early Cretaceous age (160–100 Ma), occur to the north, and are probably derived from the Rakaia Terrane. The Aspiring Terrane (Aspiring Lithologic Association) is officially included within the Torlesse Composite Terrane; however, it has a higher proportion of igneous rocks and a different sedimentary source. Its original relationship with the Rakaia Terrane is obscured by the Haast Schist.

Deposition 
The greywacke of the Torlesse Composite Terrane was deposited on the eastern side of New Zealand from the Late Carboniferous through to the Middle Cretaceous. It was deposited in giant deep sea fans that extended beyond the ends of ancient submarine canyons. A fan starts with a submarine canyon on the continental shelf. Then turbidity currents rush down the canyon like giant undersea avalanches. They carry all sorts of sediments from the shallower seafloor of the continental shelf. At the end of the canyon the turbidity current spreads out and creates giant fans of sediment that blanket the deep seafloor. These sediments may have derived in part from the granitic rocks of northeastern Australia, as suggested by studies of the mineral grains.

Metamorphism 
The Torlesse Composite Terrane has undergone metamorphism and been transformed into Haast Schist.  In the Haast Schists, the minerals that make up greywacke became coarser grained and altered to other minerals including quartz, feldspar and biotite. Rare pods of pounamu (jade) are found in the higher metamorphic grades near the Alpine Fault.

Fossil content
 Torlessia
 Monotis
 Hector's Ichthyosaur
 Nothosaur
 Conodont

See also 
 Geology of the Tasman District
 Stratigraphy of New Zealand
 Takaka Terrane
 Dun Mountain-Maitai Terrane

References

Further reading 
 The Rise and Fall of the Southern Alps, G. Coates published 2002

Terranes
Geology of New Zealand
Paleozoic Oceania
Jurassic System of Oceania
Cretaceous System of Oceania
Geography of Canterbury, New Zealand
Geography of the Marlborough Region
Geography of Otago